Félix Pons Irazazábal (14 September 1942, Palma – 2 July 2010, Id.) was a Spanish politician.  He served as the President of the Congress of Deputies of Spain from 1986 until 1996; previously he had served as the Minister of Territorial Administration. In Congress he represented the Balearic Islands. Pons was a member of the Spanish Socialist Workers' Party. He died of cancer. His brother Josep Pons is the Spanish ambassador in Austria and became the president of RCD Mallorca on 8 July 2010.

References
Obituary (in Spanish)

1942 births
2010 deaths
Presidents of the Congress of Deputies (Spain)
Government ministers of Spain
Spanish Socialist Workers' Party politicians
People from Palma de Mallorca
Deaths from cancer in Spain
University of Barcelona alumni
Academic staff of the University of the Balearic Islands
Members of the constituent Congress of Deputies (Spain)
Members of the 1st Congress of Deputies (Spain)
Members of the 3rd Congress of Deputies (Spain)
Members of the 4th Congress of Deputies (Spain)
Members of the 5th Congress of Deputies (Spain)